Griggs may refer to:

Places
Griggs County, North Dakota, U.S.
Mount Griggs (also known as Knife Peak Volcano), Katmai range, Alaska, U.S.

Other uses
Griggs (surname)
Griggs v. Duke Power Co. (1971), an employment discrimination lawsuit in the United States